Iargara is a town in Leova district, Moldova. One village, Meşeni, is administered by the town.

International relations

Twin towns — Sister cities 
Iargara is twinned with:

  Mizil, Romania

References

Cities and towns in Moldova
Leova District